Phayao may refer to:
Phayao, capital of Phayao Province, Thailand
Phayao Province, Thailand
Phayao Kingdom, a kingdom in northern Thailand
Amphoe Mueang Phayao or Mueang Phayao District, capital district of Phayao Province, Thailand
Phayao lake an artificial lake in northern Thailand, bordering on the town Phayao